The 2005 USG Sheetrock 400 was the 18th stock car race of the 2005 NASCAR Nextel Cup Series season and the fifth iteration of the event. The race was held on Sunday, July 10, 2005, before a crowd of 80,000 in Joliet, Illinois, at Chicagoland Speedway, a 1.5 miles (2.41 km) tri-oval speedway. The race took the scheduled 267 laps to complete. At race's end, Dale Earnhardt Jr., driving for Dale Earnhardt, Inc., would have better pit strategy, taking only two tires to best eventual second-place finisher, Roush Racing driver Matt Kenseth. The win was Earnhardt Jr.'s 17th career NASCAR Nextel Cup Series win and his only win of the season. To fill out the podium, Jimmie Johnson, driving for Hendrick Motorsports, would finish third.

Background 

Chicagoland Speedway is a 1.5 miles (2.41 km) tri-oval speedway in Joliet, Illinois, southwest of Chicago. The speedway opened in 2001 and currently hosts NASCAR racing. Until 2011, the speedway also hosted the IndyCar Series, recording numerous close finishes including the closest finish in IndyCar history. The speedway is owned and operated by International Speedway Corporation and located adjacent to Route 66 Raceway.

Entry list 

 (R) denotes rookie driver.

Practice

First practice 
The first practice session was held on Friday, July 8, at 11:20 AM CST. The session would last for two hours.

During the session, Joe Gibbs Racing driver Tony Stewart would cut a tire heading into turn 4, sending his car into a hard hit into the wall. As a result, from the crash, Stewart would suffer pain in his upper torso. The team's crew chief, Greg Zipadelli, decided to replace Stewart with driver J. J. Yeley for Saturday's pre-race activities, including qualifying. However, precautionary CT scans tested negative for broken ribs, and Stewart was eventually able to race on Sunday.

Second practice 
The second practice session was held on Saturday, July 9, at 9:30 AM CST. The session would last for 45 minutes.

Third and final practice 
The final practice session, sometimes referred to as Happy Hour, was held on Saturday, July 9, at 11:10 AM CST. The session would last for 45 minutes.

Qualifying 
Qualifying was held on Friday, July 8, at 3:10 PM CST. Each driver would have two laps to set a fastest time; the fastest of the two would count as their official qualifying lap.

Four drivers would fail to qualify: Kenny Wallace, Mike Garvey, P. J. Jones, and Wayne Anderson.

Full qualifying results

Race results

Standings after the race 

Drivers' Championship standings

Note: Only the first 10 positions are included for the driver standings.

References 

2005 NASCAR Nextel Cup Series
NASCAR races at Chicagoland Speedway
July 2005 sports events in the United States
2005 in sports in Illinois